Buckler is an English and German surname. Notable people with the surname include:

Charles Alban Buckler (1824–1905), English author, architect and officer of arms
Ernest Buckler (1908–1984), Canadian novelist and short story author
John Buckler (artist) (1770–1851), English artist and architect
John Chessell Buckler (1793–1894), English architect
Julius Buckler (1894–1960), German World War I fighter ace
Philip Buckler (born 1949), English Anglican Church clergyman; Dean of Lincoln
Rich Buckler (1949–2017), American comic book artist
Rich T. Buckler (1865–1950), American politician
Rick Buckler (born 1955), English rock drummer
Sandra Buckler (contemporary), aide to the Prime Minister of Canada 2006–08

English-language surnames
German-language surnames
Occupational surnames
English-language occupational surnames